In telecommunication, the term bit-count integrity (BCI) has the following meanings: 

In message communications, the preservation of the exact number of bits that are in the original message.
In connection-oriented services, preservation of the number of bits per unit time.

Note:  Bit-count integrity is not the same as bit integrity, which requires that the delivered bits correspond exactly with the original bits.

Source: from Federal Standard 1037C and from MIL-STD-188

Data transmission